White Rose Hamburgers (also known as White Rose System and formerly White Rose Diner) is a diner franchise located in Highland Park, New Jersey with a second location in Roselle, New Jersey. The restaurant franchise was ranked on America's best burgers list along with White Manna, another New Jersey burger joint.

White Rose took the name "White" to emphasize clean meat. Many other restaurants have added the name "White" in their title based on this. In 2013, White Rose opened a location in New Brunswick, New Jersey.

White Rose has daily deliveries of bread and meat. Orders are processed quickly in a streamlined process which has remained the same for decades.

References

External links

Diners in New Jersey
Restaurants in New Jersey
Highland Park, New Jersey
Roselle, New Jersey